Alexander Caldwell (November 1, 1774 – April 8, 1839) was a United States district judge of the United States District Court for the Western District of Virginia.

Education and career

Born on November 1, 1774, in the Province of New Jersey, British America, Caldwell read law in 1816. He entered private practice in Westville, Pennsylvania from 1816 to 1818. He continued private practice in the Missouri Territory from 1818 to 1820, and in Wheeling, Virginia (now West Virginia) from 1820 to 1826.

Federal judicial service

Caldwell received a recess appointment from President John Quincy Adams on October 28, 1825, to a seat on the United States District Court for the Western District of Virginia vacated by Judge Phillip C. Pendleton. He was nominated to the same position by President Adams on December 13, 1825. He was confirmed by the United States Senate on January 3, 1826, and received his commission the same day. His service terminated on April 8, 1839, due to his death in Wheeling, Virginia. He was succeeded by Judge Isaac S. Pennybacker.

Family

Caldwell was the son of James Caldwell (1724–1804) and his wife Elizabeth. Irish gentry whose name reflected Castle Caldwell established in Ulster Plantation a century earlier, they had emigrated with nine children to Maryland in 1769 and then moved to what became Wheeling in what was then Virginia in 1772. During their sea voyage, Elizabeth Caldwell gave birth to Samuel Caldwell, and in Baltimore she bore James Caldwell (1770–1838, later of St. Clairsville, Ohio and President of the Merchants' and ^Mechanics' Bank of Wheeling, as well as United States Representative from Ohio), then Susana Caldwell (b. 1772), this Alexander Caldwell, and Joseph Caldwell (b. 1777). James Caldwell the elder became a Virginia justice of the peace and militia leader in the developing rural area, and his son/Alexander's brother John Caldwell helped erect Fort Henry to defend the new settlement against Native American raiders.

References

Sources
 

1774 births
1839 deaths
Virginia lawyers
Judges of the United States District Court for the Western District of Virginia
United States federal judges appointed by John Quincy Adams
19th-century American judges
Politicians from Wheeling, West Virginia
United States federal judges admitted to the practice of law by reading law
Lawyers from Wheeling, West Virginia
Caldwell family